John Murphy Farley (April 20, 1842 – September 17, 1918) was an Irish-American cardinal of the Catholic Church. He served as Archbishop of New York from 1902 until his death in 1918, and became a cardinal in 1911.

Early life and education
John Farley was born in Newtownhamilton, County Armagh, Ireland, to Catherine (née Murphy) and Philip Farrelly. At age twelve, he was orphaned and went to live with his mother's family in the townland of Moyles. He received his early education under the direction of a private tutor named Hugh McGuire. He then attended St. Macartan's College in Monaghan from 1859 to 1864.

Under the auspices of an uncle, Farley emigrated to the United States at the height of the Civil War in 1864. He immediately enrolled at St. John's College in New York City, graduating in 1865. He then began his studies for the priesthood at St. Joseph's Provincial Seminary in Troy. In 1866, he was sent to continue his studies at the Pontifical North American College in Rome. He was present in Rome during the whole period of the First Vatican Council.

Priesthood
Farley was ordained a priest by Cardinal Costantino Patrizi Naro on June 11, 1870. His first assignment, following his return to New York, was as a curate at St. Peter's Church (Staten Island), where he remained for two years. Following the appointment of Francis McNeirny to the Diocese of Albany, in 1872 Farley became secretary to Archbishop John McCloskey, whom he had earlier met while in Rome. It was about this time that he changed the spelling of his name from "Farrelly" to "Farley". He accompanied McCloskey to the 1878 papal conclave, but they arrived after the election of Pope Leo XIII had already taken place. Farley wrote the article on Cardinal McCloskey for the Catholic Encyclopedia.

From 1884 to 1902, Farley served as pastor of St. Gabriel's Church in Manhattan. During his tenure at St. Gabriel's, he freed the parish from debt, oversaw the consecration of the church, and built a parish hall. He was named a papal chamberlain in 1884 with the title of "monsignor", and raised to the rank of domestic prelate in 1892. In addition to his pastoral duties at St. Gabriel's, Farley served as vicar general for the Archdiocese of New York from 1891 to 1902. He also served as president of the Catholic school board, in which position he organized a Catholic school parade in 1892. He later organized a Catholic school exhibit in 1894. He became a protonotary apostolic in 1895.

Episcopal career

On November 18, 1895, Farley was appointed auxiliary bishop of New York and titular bishop of Zeugma in Syria by Leo XIII. He received his episcopal consecration on the following December 21 from Archbishop Michael Corrigan, with Bishops Charles Edward McDonnell and Henry Gabriels serving as co-consecrators, at St. Patrick's Cathedral. Farley became Apostolic Administrator of the archdiocese upon the death of Archbishop Corrigan on May 5, 1902, and was himself named the fourth Archbishop of New York on September 15 of that year. He was honored as an Assistant at the Pontifical Throne in 1905.

Pope Pius X created him Cardinal Priest of Santa Maria sopra Minerva in the consistory of November 27, 1911. He was one of the cardinal electors who participated in the 1914 papal conclave, which selected Pope Benedict XV. Following the outbreak of World War I, Farley stated, "As Catholics in America, we owe unswerving allegiance to the Government of America, and it is our sacred duty to answer with alacrity every demand our country makes upon our loyalty and devotion... I would that peace could come by arbitration and diplomacy. It seems, however, that no permanent peace can be hoped for except through the defeat of German arms in the field or the repudiation of the Prussian autocracy by the German people themselves. Criticism of the government irritates me. I consider it little short of treason." His dedication to victory in the war angered the Sinn Féin element of the New York clergy, who believed the Cardinal was bowing to anti-Irish bigots.

He made progress in Catholic education in the archdiocese the keynote of his tenure as Archbishop, and established nearly fifty new parochial schools within his first eight years; he also founded the Cathedral Preparatory Seminary. He was known to take daily walks with one of his priests down Madison or Fifth Avenue, noting, "A man never collects his thoughts so well as when he walks alone or with a congenial spirit."

Farley died in Mamaroneck, at age 76. He is buried in the crypt under the altar of St. Patrick's Cathedral.

Further reading
  Thomas J. Shelley; "John Cardinal Farley and Modernism in New York" Church History, Vol. 61, 1992

Sources
 The Hierarchy of the Catholic Church Retrieved 2010-04-20.

References

External links
 
 

1842 births
1918 deaths
19th-century Irish people
19th-century Roman Catholic bishops in the United States
20th-century American cardinals
American Roman Catholic clergy of Irish descent
Irish emigrants to the United States (before 1923)
People from County Armagh
Clergy from New York City
Roman Catholic archbishops of New York
Burials at St. Patrick's Cathedral (Manhattan)
Contributors to the Catholic Encyclopedia
Cardinals created by Pope Pius X
American expatriates in Italy
People educated at St Macartan's College, Monaghan
Irish cardinals